James M. Lewis Jr. (September 19, 1943 – June 1, 2022) was an American pharmacist and politician.

Lewis was born in Chattanooga, Tennessee, and grew up in South Pittsburg, Tennessee. He graduated from South Pittsburg High School, University of Tennessee and Samford University. He lived in South Pittsburg, Tennessee with his wife and family and was a pharmacist. He served in the Tennessee Senate from 1986 to 1990.

References

1943 births
2022 deaths
People from South Pittsburg, Tennessee
Pharmacists from Tennessee
Politicians from Chattanooga, Tennessee
Samford University alumni
Tennessee state senators
University of Tennessee alumni